= William Krupke =

Physicist at Lawrence Livermore National Laboratory

William Krupke was a physicist at the Lawrence Livermore National Laboratory in Livermore, California. He was named a Fellow of the Institute of Electrical and Electronics Engineers (IEEE) in 2016 for his research in laser science and technology.
